Nemo Thomsen (born 5 April 2004) is a Greenlandic association footballer who currently plays for Kolding IF and the Greenland national team.

Club career
Thomsen is from Ilulissat, Greenland. During the 2018 Greenlandic Football Championship he scored a hattrick for Nagdlunguaq-48 at age fourteen to become the youngest goalscorer in the tournament.

In 2019 he moved to Southern Jutland in Denmark for more footballing opportunities. Shortly thereafter he began playing for the academy of SønderjyskE while living with a host family for six months before moving into player housing on Louisevej. Following his move to Kolding IF, Thomsen made his debut for the U17 side on 1 April 2021 in a spring season 3–0 victory over Næstved U17.

In February 2023, Thomsen saw minutes for Kolding's senior squad as part of a training camp held in Turkey. Kolding IF faced clubs from Latvia, Denmark, and Bosnia and Herzegovina during the camp.

International career
Thomsen represented Greenland in futsal at the 2018 Arctic Winter Games in Canada's Northwest Territories. Going into the semi-finals, he was the juvenile male division's top scorer in the competition with eighteen goals. He finished the tournament as top scorer with twenty-two goals, more than twice the number scored by any other single player, as Greenland beat Yamalo-Nenets in the final to win the gold medal.

He received his first call up to the Greenland national football team by head coach Morten Rutkjær in October 2020. At 16 years old, he was the youngest player in the 40-man squad. In August 2021, Rutkjær named Thomsen to the 24-man squad that would train and compete against several Danish clubs in Denmark the following month. Thomsen was one of two Denmark-based players in the squad, along with Adam Ejler of HB Køge.

He was then part of the roster for Greenland's first match against an official national team after beginning the process of joining CONCACAF, a hybrid friendly match against Kosovo U21 to be played in Turkey in September 2022. In the opening match of the training camp, Thomsen converted a penalty for Greenland's only goal in a 1–6 defeat to Al-Kahrabaa of the Iraqi Premier League.

Personal
Thomsen is the son of former Greenlandic international Niels Thomsen. His brother, Paluu, also plays for the academy of Kolding IF.

References

External links

2004 births
Living people
Greenlandic footballers
Kolding IF players
Association football forwards